The ranat thum is a low pitched xylophone used in the music of Thailand. It has 18 wooden keys, which are stretched over a boat-shaped trough resonator. Its shape looks like a ranat ek, but it is lower and wider. It is usually played in accompaniment of a ranat ek.

ranat thum bars are typically made from bamboo, although instruments with rosewood (Dalbergia oliveri; ; mai ching chan) bars can also be found.

It is similar to a Cambodian xylophone called roneat thung.

External links
Sound sample
ranat thum page

Thai musical instruments
Keyboard percussion instruments